Bradley Jamie Ethan Young (born 6 January 2003) is an English professional footballer who plays as a forward for Premier League club Aston Villa.

Career
Having been on the books of West Bromwich Albion  before being released at age 12, he joined Aston Villa after a spell in local  junior football and became a regular at U18 and then U23 level. He made his senior debut as a substitute in a 4–1 FA Cup defeat to Liverpool on 8 January 2021.

Young was a part of the Aston Villa team that won the 2020-21 FA Youth Cup - scoring a penalty in the 2–1 final victory over Liverpool U18s on 24 May 2021.

On 7 July 2021, he was one of several young players who signed a new contract with Aston Villa.

On 16 August 2021, Young joined League Two team Carlisle United on a season-long loan. He made his football league debut the following day, as a substitute in a goalless draw against Port Vale. On 28 September 2021, Young scored his first goals for Carlisle United - scoring twice in a 2–0 victory over Everton U21 in the EFL Trophy. Young returned to Aston Villa from his loan early on 4 January 2022, after the two clubs mutually agreed that Young would not be guaranteed enough playing time in the upcoming months.

On 1 September 2022, Young joined Scottish Championship club Ayr United on a season-long loan. Young scored his first professional league goal on 17 September, in a 3–2 defeat to Raith Rovers. On 17 January 2023, Young's loan was cut short and he returned to Aston Villa.

Personal life 
Young was hospitalised in June 2020, at the age of 17, after being the victim of a stabbing in a Solihull park. He made a full recovery and was able to play again for the Aston Villa academy the same season.

Career statistics

Honours 
Aston Villa U18
 FA Youth Cup: 2020-21

References

2003 births
Living people
English footballers
Association football forwards
Aston Villa F.C. players
English victims of crime
Carlisle United F.C. players
English Football League players
Ayr United F.C. players
Scottish Professional Football League players